Justin F. Kimball High School is a public secondary school in the Oak Cliff area of Dallas, Texas, United States. It enrolls students in grades 9–12, and is a part of the Dallas Independent School District. The school is named in honor of Justin Ford Kimball, a prominent citizen of Dallas, Texas, former school superintendent, and founder of a predecessor of the Blue Cross and Blue Shield Association. In 2015, the school was rated "Met Standard" by the Texas Education Agency.

It serves a section of Cockrell Hill.

History
Kimball opened its doors in 1958, graduating its first class in 1960 with 165 students. Dr. W.P. Durrett served as the founding principal of the school. His tenure of 16 years ran from 1958 until his retirement in 1974, and was longer than that of any subsequent principal. Through his inspiring and dynamic leadership, the student body established the traditions and values of the school. An annual scholarship award in his name is granted each year by the Kimball Alumni Association to two outstanding students who demonstrate academic and leadership success.

Although Dallas ISD began integrating high school campuses in the 1965–1966 school year, Kimball's student body was primarily Caucasian until the late 1970s. The ethnic makeup of the student body changed gradually during the 1980s, and by 1990 Kimball's students were almost entirely African-American. Today, Kimball is roughly 70% Hispanic and 30% African-American. When Moisés E. Molina High School opened in 1996, attendance boundaries were redrawn, and many areas that had attended Kimball for decades were rezoned to the new school.

Since its founding in 1958, the school has graduated over 20,000 students. Kimball graduates have contributed in many fields - athletics, politics, entertainment, music, health, business, cultural, arts, science, and engineering.  A number of Kimball students have won appointments to various military service academies through the years.

In 2008, the school celebrated its fiftieth anniversary with a celebration hosted by the Kimball Alumni Association.

Athletics
The Kimball Knights compete in the following sports:

Baseball
Basketball
Cross country
Football 
Golf
Soccer
Softball
Swimming and diving
Tennis
Track and field
Volleyball
Wrestling

Kimball has excelled for many years in state, regional and district sports, capturing several championships in football, track, wrestling, basketball, golf, and volleyball. The men's varsity basketball team won the state basketball championship in 1990, 1996, 1997, 2011, 2012, 2014, and 2023. The girls' soccer team won the first ever UIL State Soccer Championship in 1983, and repeated as State Champion in 1984.

Neighborly
Kimball High School has had a long and storied rivalry in sports with David W. Carter High School. The annual football game between the two is known as "The Oak Cliff Super Bowl".

Controversy 
In January 2020, a shooting incident occurred during a high school basketball game at the Davis Field House in Dallas. According to a press release from the Dallas Police Department, a fight broke out at the location at around 9:10 p.m., resulting in the shooting of an 18-year-old male. The individual was transported to a local hospital where they remained in critical condition the following night. The teams involved in the game were identified as South Oak Cliff High School and Justin F. Kimball High School.

In late March 2022, according to Dallas Weekly, a group of students from Justin F. Kimball High School in Dallas organized a walk-out to express their dissatisfaction with the quality of food being served in the school. The demonstration was initially planned and announced by students via an Instagram page, which had been documenting food-related issues at the school for several weeks, including mold found on sandwiches and discolored oranges.

Notable alumni

Michael Adams (2002) — former NFL player
Steve Bartlett (1966) — U.S. Congressman (1983-1991), Mayor of Dallas (1991—1995)
David Chalk (1968) — baseball player, first-round draft choice of California Angels
Tim Choate (1973) — actor film and television actor
Tashaun Gipson (2008) — NFL player for Jacksonville Jaguars, Cleveland Browns
DeMarcus Granger (2005) – former NFL defensive tackle
Brandon Harrison (1990) — football player, University of Illinois (1995), 4th-round pick for San Diego Chargers
Bob Johnson — MLB player for Texas Rangers
Jalen Jones (born 1993) - basketball player for Hapoel Haifa in the Israeli Basketball Premier League
Don King (1982) — Green Bay Packers quarterback (1987)
Acie Law (2003) — NBA player for Atlanta Hawks
Ken Lacy (1979) — former NFL player
Sheryl Stamps Leach (1970) — creator of famous children's purple dinosaur "Barney" 
Belita Moreno (1968) — actress, best known for playing Benita "Benny" Lopez on George Lopez
Marquis Pleasant — former NFL player (Cincinnati Bengals)
Mike Rhyner — former radio host of The Hardline on KTCK
Quinton Ross (1999) — former NBA player for Dallas Mavericks
Jeryl Sasser (1997) — former NBA player, played for Bnei HaSharon of Israeli basketball league
Jason Sasser (1992) — former NBA player
Chad Slaughter (1995) — former NFL player
Phillip Tanner (2006) — former NFL player for Dallas Cowboys
Stephen Tobolowsky (1969) — Tony Award-nominated actor
Stevie Ray Vaughan — Rock and Roll Hall of Fame musician & 6-time Grammy winner
B. J. Ward (2000) — former NFL player
Marvin Washington (1984) — former NFL player San Francisco 49ers, Denver Broncos, and New York Jets
Todd Whitten (1983) — head football coach, Sam Houston State University

References

External links

 
 Justin F. Kimball alumni page

Dallas Independent School District high schools
Public high schools in Dallas
Educational institutions established in 1958
1958 establishments in Texas